{{DISPLAYTITLE:Tau1 Gruis}}

Tau1 Gruis, Latinized from τ1 Gruis, and catalogued as HD 216435 and HR 8700, is a yellow-hued star approximately 106 light-years away in the constellation of Grus (the Crane). The star is visible to the naked eye for some people, placing it in the Bright Star Catalogue. In 2002, one extrasolar planet was confirmed to orbit the star.

Characteristics 
Tau1 Gruis is a G-type main-sequence star of spectral type G0 V. It is estimated that the star has about 1.28 times the mass of the Sun, 1.71 times the Sun's radius, and about 3.6 times the luminosity. Due to its unusual brightness, at least one source suspects that the star may be a highly evolved subgiant star. It is thought that Tau1 Gruis is about 1.4 times more enriched with elements heavier than hydrogen, making a high abundance of iron likely. The Ca-II H line of the star suggests that it is chromospherically inactive, making it significantly older than previously predicted.

Planetary system 
On September 17, 2002, a team of astronomers led by Geoffrey Marcy announced the discovery of a giant planet around Tau1 Gruis. The radial velocity measurements suggest that the star has a companion with at least 1.23 times the mass of Jupiter. The planet's orbit stays inside the system's habitable zone for most of its revolution around the star, though at apoapsis, the planet falls outside of this zone.

See also
 Rho Indi
 55 Cancri

References

External links
 
 

Gruis, Tau1
G-type main-sequence stars
Grus (constellation)
216435
113044
8700
9802
Planetary systems with one confirmed planet
Durchmusterung objects